The Lola T140 was an open-wheel formula race car, designed, developed and built by Lola Cars, for Formula 5000 racing, in 1968.

References

T140
Formula 5000 cars